The Visual Effects Society Award for Outstanding Compositing in a Photoreal Episode is one of the annual awards given by the Visual Effects Society, starting in 2003. It is awarded to visual effects artists for their work in compositing. It has gone through several title changes over the years; from 2003 to 2012, the category included commercials in the category, before refocusing in 2013, specifically nominating television programs.

Winners and nominees

2000s

2010s

2020s

Programs with multiple awards

7 awards
 Game of Thrones (HBO)
|}

Programs with multiple nominations

16 nominations
 Game of Thrones (HBO)

4 nominations
 Smallville (The WB/CW)

3 nominations
 The Mandalorian (Disney+)
 Vikings (History)

2 nominations
 Battlestar Galactica (ABC)
 Boardwalk Empire (HBO)
 WandaVision (Disney+)

References

C
Awards established in 2002